The 2011 FIFA Club World Cup took place in Toyota and Yokohama, Japan, from 8 December to 18 December 2011. The final 23-man squads had to be submitted by 28 November, with all members of the final squad taken from a provisional list of 30 players. All players were required to be registered with squad numbers between 1 and 23, unless they were registered for their domestic league with a different number. In the event of an injury to one of the players on the final list, that player could be replaced with a player from the provisional list no less than 24 hours before his team's first match in the competition. Santos released their preliminary squad on 29 October, which was cut down to 23 on 28 November. Auckland City added their squad on 24 November. Monterrey announced their 2011 FIFA Club World Cup squad on 30 November on their official website.

Al-Sadd
Manager:  Jorge Fossati

Auckland City
Manager:  Ramon Tribulietx

 (Captain)

Barcelona
Manager: Pep Guardiola

Espérance
Manager: Nabil Maaloul

Monterrey
Manager: Víctor Manuel Vucetich

Santos
Manager: Muricy Ramalho

Kashiwa Reysol
Manager:  Nelsinho Baptista

References

External links
FIFA Club World Cup Japan 2011 Provisional List of Players
FIFA Club World Cup Japan 2011 Official List of Players

Squads
FIFA Club World Cup squads